The church of San Secondo di Magnano is built in a wide open space near the Serra d'Ivrea, not far from the Bose monastic community, in the comune (municipality) of Magnano, Italy. It is one of the most interesting examples of the Romanesque architecture in the Provincia di Biella and the Canavese.

History and architecture
There used to be an older, small church on the site of today's San Secondo. This church was probably built by the Benedictines. In the first half of the 11th century the structure was raised and enlarged up to its current size.
The architecture is typically Romanesque, with a projecting façade. The interior consists of a nave flanked by two aisles. The central nave and the left aisle end both with an apse with a small window. The right aisle's apse has probably been demolished to make room for the bell tower, an elegant structure with mullioned windows in its upper section.

The inside of the church is divided into a nave and two aisles by rectangular pillars with rounded arch; the ceiling is a truss. At the bottom of the right aisle, on the bell towers wall, there is a fresco from the 13th ir 14th century, representing a Crucifixion with the Virgin and Saint John.

The church was originally built in the ancient hamlet of Magnano, but at the end of the 14th century the village moved to Magnano's current location. At the beginning of the 17th century the parish church was moved to the new church of Santa Marta and there was no reason to preserve the old Romanesque building, so it was decided, in 1606, to demolish San Secondo in order to use its materials to build the new church. The devotee, however, took position against this decision and succeeded in maintaining the church. Baroque decorations were added. During the 19th century the church was abandoned again. Only in 1968 did the Province of Vercelli decide to restore the building and to restore its original Romanesque look.

Gallery

Bibliography
 Comunità monastica di Bose (a cura della) La Serra: Chiese Romaniche, edizioni Qiqajon, 1999

See also 
 CoEur - In the heart of European paths
 Via Francigena
 Path of Saint Charles

References 

Churches in the province of Biella
14th-century Roman Catholic church buildings in Italy
Magnano